

This is a list of the first music videos broadcast on MTV's first day, August 1, 1981. MTV's first day on the air was rebroadcast on VH1 Classic in 2006 and again in 2011 (the latter celebrating the channel's 30th anniversary). The first hour on the air was broadcast again on August 1, 2016, and was called MTV Hour One, as part of VH1 Classic's planned re-launch as MTV Classic, MTV itself, and additionally streamed on the channel's Facebook page.

The first video to air on MTV was one emblematic of MTV's concept, The Buggles' "Video Killed the Radio Star" which was then immediately followed by a brief message about music and television coming together and then "You Better Run" by Pat Benatar. 116 unique videos were played, spanning 209 spins over the first 24 hours; from the beginning, MTV used the rotation system and repeated popular videos throughout the day. "You Better You Bet" by the Who, which was also the first video to be repeated, "Just Between You and Me" by April Wine, and "In the Air Tonight" by Phil Collins were each played five times. Rod Stewart made the most total appearances that day with 16, with 11 of his videos being played.

Due to being a brand new cable network, the first day featured numerous errors including playing clips at the wrong times, moments of dead air, videos that wouldn't play correctly and other technical difficulties.

References

General references
 Hoye, Jacob. MTV Uncensored. Pocket Books, 2002. .
 Boston Globe: MTV's first 10 music videos

Notes

Inline citations

External links

 MTV Yearbook: 1981 from the MTV website

1981 in American television
1981 in music
1980s television-related lists

Music videos aired on MTV
Lists of music videos
Lists of songs
MTV
American television-related lists
American music-related lists
August 1981 events in the United States